The Tirana Mosaic is a landmark in Tirana, Albania.

It is believed to have been part of a 3rd-century Roman house, referred to by local archeologists as the 'Villa rustica'. Later, in the 5th and 6th centuries, a Paleo-Christian Basilica was built around this site. It was declared a cultural monument of the first category in June 1973.

The ruins of this Paleo-Christian Basilica were discovered in 1972. In 2002, some other objects were found around the ruins of the house, and today they form the archaeological complex in Tirana. It is the only archaeological monument within the city.
Some of the ancient mosaics discovered at the site that feature diverse geometrical patterns and depict poultry and fish.
It was re-opened to the public on 23 January 2010.

Where? 
Many Tirana Mosaics originated from the city, but have travelled over to places like England and South America. As Albania shares a border with Greece, the Mosaic have also originated from there.

Gallery

References

Roman mosaics
Buildings and structures in Tirana
Tourist attractions in Tirana
Archaeological sites in Albania
Cultural Monuments of Albania
Buildings and structures completed in the 3rd century
3rd-century establishments in the Roman Empire